The qp ligature, ȹ, is a typographic ligature of Latin q and p, and is used in some phonetic transcription systems, particularly for African languages, to represent a voiceless labiodental plosive , for example in the Zulu sequence .

In Unicode

References
Unicode Character 'LATIN SMALL LETTER QP DIGRAPH' (U+0239)

See also

ȸ

QP
QP